Branka Konatar  (born 2 November 1999) is a Montenegrin handball player for RK Krim and the Montenegrin national team.

She was selected to represent Montenegro at the 2017 World Women's Handball Championship.

References

External links

1999 births
Living people
Montenegrin female handball players 
Mediterranean Games medalists in handball
Mediterranean Games silver medalists for Montenegro
Competitors at the 2018 Mediterranean Games